Gustav Adolf Land is the land area of the southwestern part of Nordaustlandet, Svalbard, south of Wahlenbergfjorden. The area is named after Gustaf VI Adolf of Sweden.

References

Geography of Svalbard
Nordaustlandet